Trisandhya is a 1972 Bollywood drama film directed by Raj Marbros. The film stars Bhaskar Unni, P.K. Abraham and Waheeda Rehman.

Cast

Soundtrack

Reception

External links
 

1972 films
1970s Hindi-language films
1972 drama films
Indian drama films
Hindi-language drama films